Fidel Cashflow 2006 is a mixtape by Queens DJ & producer DJ Clue?.

Track listing

References

2006 mixtape albums
DJ Clue? albums